Mihai Radu Mihuț (born 16 March 1995) is a Romanian Greco-Roman wrestler. He is a gold medalist at the European Wrestling Championships.

Career 

He won the gold medal in the 63 kg event at the 2018 European Wrestling Championships held in Kaspiysk, Russia. In the final, he defeated Stig-André Berge of Norway. In that same year, he also won the gold medal in the men's 63 kg event at the 2018 European U23 Wrestling Championship held in Istanbul, Turkey.

In 2020, he competed in the men's 63 kg event at the Individual Wrestling World Cup held in Belgrade, Serbia. In March 2021, he competed at the European Qualification Tournament in Budapest, Hungary hoping to qualify for the 2020 Summer Olympics in Tokyo, Japan. He was eliminated in his first match by Islambek Dadov of Azerbaijan.

In 2022, he competed in the 67 kg event at the European Wrestling Championships in Budapest, Hungary where he was eliminated in his first match. A few months later, he lost his bronze medal match in his event at the Matteo Pellicone Ranking Series 2022 held in Rome, Italy.

Achievements

References

External links 
 

Living people
1995 births
Place of birth missing (living people)
Romanian male sport wrestlers
European Wrestling Championships medalists
20th-century Romanian people
21st-century Romanian people